Enterprise Plaza (also known as 1100 Louisiana) is a 55-story,  skyscraper at 1100 Louisiana Street in downtown Houston, Texas The headquarters of Enterprise Products is located in the Enterprise Plaza. 

Enterprise Plaza was completed in 1980 by Hines. It was sold in 1985 to Capitol Guidance Corporation which sold it again to National Office Partners Limited Partnership (NOP), a joint venture between Hines Interests Limited Partnership and the California Public Employees Retirement System (CalPERS). Hines Real Estate bought the tower in January 2000.

Enterprise Plaza is an office building located in the heart of Houston's energy and financial corridor. It stands at 756 ft (230 m) tall with 55 stories. It was the tallest building in Texas from 1980 until 1982 when it was surpassed by the JPMorgan Chase Tower.

Major tenants 
 Enbridge
 Enterprise Products
 Forest Oil Corporation
 King & Spalding
 Credit Suisse

See also

List of tallest buildings in Houston
List of tallest buildings in Texas
List of tallest buildings in the United States

References

External links
1100 Louisiana at Hines Interests Limited Partnership
Images of Enterprise Plaza

Office buildings completed in 1980
Skyscraper office buildings in Houston
Hines Interests Limited Partnership
Skidmore, Owings & Merrill buildings
Buildings and structures in Houston